In NATO, a standardization agreement (STANAG, redundantly: STANAG agreement) defines processes, procedures, terms, and conditions for common military or technical procedures or equipment between the member countries of the alliance. Each NATO state ratifies a STANAG and implements it within its own military. The purpose is to provide common operational and administrative procedures and logistics, so one member nation's military may use the stores and support of another member's military.
STANAGs also form the basis for technical interoperability between a wide variety of communication and information systems (CIS) essential for NATO and Allied operations. The Allied Data Publication 34 (ADatP-34) NATO Interoperability Standards and Profiles which is covered by STANAG 5524, maintains a catalogue of relevant information and communication technology standards. 

STANAGs are published in English and French, the two official languages of NATO, by the NATO Standardization Office in Brussels.

Among the hundreds of standardization agreements (the total  was just short of 1,300) are those for calibres of small arms ammunition, map markings, communications procedures, and classification of bridges.

Partial list 

STANAG 1008 (Edition 9, 24 August 2004): Characteristics of Shipboard Electrical Power Systems in Warships of the North Atlantic Treaty Navies
STANAG 1022 (Edition 6): Combat Charts, Amphibious Charts and Combat/Landing Charts
STANAG 1034 (Edition 17, 24 May 2005): Allied Naval Gunfire Support (ATP-4(E))
STANAG 1040 (Edition 23, 16 December 2004): Naval Cooperation and Guidance for Shipping (NCAGS) (ATP-2(B) Vol. 1)
STANAG 1041 (Edition 16, 29 March 2001): Anti-Submarine Evasive Steering (ATP-3(B))
STANAG 1052 (Edition 32, 12 July 2006): Allied Submarine and Anti-Submarine Exercise Manual (AXP-01(D))
STANAG 1059 (Edition 8, 19 February 2004): National Distinguishing Letters for Use by NATO Armed Forces
STANAG 1063 (Edition 18): Allied Naval Communications Exercises (AXP-3(C) MXP-3(C))
STANAG 1236 (Edition 3, 2 November 2010): Glide Slope Indicators for Helicopter Operations from NATO Ships
STANAG 1472 (Edition 1, 7 September 2011): NVD Compatible Flight Deck Status Displays on Single Ships
STANAG 2003 (Edition 6): Patrol Reports
STANAG 2014 (Edition 7): Operations Plans, Warning Orders, and Administrative/Logistics Orders
STANAG 2019 (Edition 6, 24 May 2011): NATO Joint Military Symbology – NATO Military Symbols for Land Based Systems (APP-6)
STANAG 2021 Military Load Classification of Bridges, Rafts and Vehicles
STANAG 2022 Intelligence Reports
STANAG 2033 Interrogation of Prisoners of War (PW)
STANAG 2041 (Edition 4): Operations Orders, Tables and Graphics for Road Movement
STANAG 2044 (Edition 5): Procedures for Dealing with Prisoners of War
STANAG 2083 Radiological Hazards
STANAG 2084 (Edition 5): Handling and Reporting of Captured Enemy Equipment and Documents
STANAG 2085 NATO Combined Military Police
STANAG 2087 Medical Employment of Air Transport in the Forward Area
STANAG 2097 (Edition 6): Nomenclature and Classification of Equipment
STANAG 2116 – this STANAG covers, among other subjects, NATO official rank grade comparisons covering Ranks and insignia of NATO
STANAG 2138 (Edition 4, May 1996): Troop trial Principles and Procedures – Combat Clothing and Personal Equipment
STANAG 2143 (Edition 4): Explosive Ordnance Reconnaissance/Explosive Ordnance Disposal
STANAG 2149 (Edition 3): Intelligence Request
STANAG 2154 Regulations for Military Motor Vehicle Movement by Road
STANAG 2175 (Edition 3): Classification and Designation of Flat Wagons Suitable for Transporting Military Equipment
STANAG 2310 7.62×51mm NATO adopted in the 1950s as the standard infantry rifle cartridge (7.62mm) up until the 1980s
STANAG 2324 The adoption of the US MIL-STD-1913 "Picatinny rail" as the NATO standard optical and electronic sight mount and standard accessory rail (canceled). See also 4694.
STANAG 2345 (Edition 3, 13 February 2003): Evaluation and control of personnel exposure to radio frequency fields – 3 kHz to 300 GHz
STANAG 2389 (Edition 1): Minimum Standards of Proficiency for Trained Explosive Ordnance Disposal Personnel
STANAG 2404 (Draft): Joint Anti-Armor Operations
STANAG 2509 Civil-military co-operation (CIMIC) doctrine
STANAG 2433 (published Jan 2005): The military intelligence intelligence data
STANAG 2437 Allied Joint Publication AJP-01: "ALLIED JOINT DOCTRINE" 
STANAG 2525 Allied Joint Doctrine for Communications and Information Systems
STANAG 2604 (Edition 3, 14 Aug 1992): Braking Systems Between Tractors, Draw Bar Trailer And Semi-trailer Equipment Combinations For Military Use
STANAG 2805 Fording and Flotation Requirements for Combat and Support Ground Vehicles
STANAG 2832 (Edition 2): Restrictions for the Transport of Military Equipment by Rail on European Railways
STANAG 2834 (Edition 2): The Operation of the Explosive Ordnance Disposal Technical Information Center (EODTIC)
STANAG 2866 Medical Effects of Ionizing Radiation on Personnel
STANAG 2868 (Edition 4): Land Force Tactical Doctrine (ATP-35(A))
STANAG 2873 Medical Support Operations in an NBC Environment
STANAG 2889 (Edition 3): Marking of Hazardous Areas and Routes Through Them
STANAG 2895 Extreme Climatic Conditions and Derived Conditions for Use in Defining Design/Test Criteria for NATO Forces Materiel
STANAG 2920 The adoption of standards for ballistic protection levels and testing
STANAG 2931 Distinctive Markings and Camouflage of Medical Facilities and Evacuation Platforms
STANAG 2937 Survival, Emergency, and Individual Combat Rations – nutritional values and packaging
STANAG 2961 Classes of Supply of NATO Land Forces
STANAG 2984 Graduated Levels of Chemical, Biological, Radiological and Nuclear Threats and Associated Protective Measures
STANAG 2999 (Edition 1): Use of Helicopters in Land Operations (ATP-49)
STANAG 3011: Joint Range Extension Applications Protocol (JREAP), a Tactical Data Link (TDL) protocol
STANAG 3117 Aircraft Marshalling Signals
STANAG 3150 Uniform System of Supply Classification
STANAG 3151 Uniform System of Item of Supply Identification
STANAG 3277 (Edition 6): Air Reconnaissance Request/Task Form
STANAG 3350: Analogue Video Standard for Aircraft System Applications
STANAG 3377: Air Reconnaissance Intelligence Report Forms
STANAG 3497 (Edition 1): Aeromedical Training of Aircrew in Aircrew NBC Equipment and Procedures
STANAG 3585 (Edition 6): 20x102mm autocannon ammunition
STANAG 3596 Air Reconnaissance Requesting and Target Reporting Guide
STANAG 3680 AAP-6 NATO Glossary of Terms and Definitions
STANAG 3700 (Edition 4): NATO Tactical Air Doctrine (ATP-33(B))
STANAG 3736 (Edition 8): Offensive Air Support Operations (ATP-27(B))
STANAG 3797 (27 Apr 2009) Minimum Qualifications for Forward Air Controllers & Laser Operators in Support of Forward Air Controllers
STANAG 3805 (Edition 4): Doctrine and Procedures for Airspace Control in Time of Crisis and War (ATP-40(A))
STANAG 3820 (Edition 3): 27×145mm autocannon ammunition
STANAG 3838: MIL-STD-1553, mechanical, electrical and functional characteristics of a serial data bus
STANAG 3880 (Edition 2): Counter Air Operations (ATP-42(B))
STANAG 3910 High Speed Data Transmission Under STANAG 3838 or Fibre Optic Equivalent Control – 1Mbit/sec MIL-STD-1553B data bus augmented by a 20 Mbit/s, Optical or Electrical, High Speed (HS) channel. Revised by prEN 3910, which remains provisional. Optical version implemented (as EFAbus) on the Eurofighter Typhoon (EF2000)) and electrical (as EN 3910) on Dassault Rafale.
STANAG 4007 (Edition 2, 31 May 1996): Electrical Connectors Between Prime Movers, Trailers And Towed Artillery
STANAG 4082 (Edition 2, 28 May 1969): Adoption of a Standard Artillery Computer Meteorological Message (METCM)
STANAG 4090 9×19mm NATO adopted as standard small arms ammunition (9 mm)
STANAG 4101 (Edition 2, 21 Feb 2000): Towing Attachments
STANAG 4107 (Edition 7, August 2006): Mutual Acceptance of Government Quality Assurance and Usage of the Allied Quality Assurance Publications
STANAG 4140 (Edition 2, 28 May 2001): Adoption of a Standard Target Acquisition Meteorological Message (METTA)
STANAG 4119 (Edition 2, 5 February 2007): Adoption of a Standard Cannon Artillery Firing Table Format)
STANAG 4172 The adoption of the 5.56×45mm NATO round as the standard chambering of all NATO service rifles
STANAG 4173 25x137mm autocannon ammunition
STANAG 4184 (Edition 3, 27 November 1998): Microwave Landing System (MLS)
STANAG 4203 Technical standards for single channel HF radio equipment
STANAG 4222 (Edition 1, 14 March 1990): Standard Specification for Digital Representation of Shipboard Data Parameters
STANAG 4232 Digital Interoperability Between SHF Tactical Satellite Communications Terminals
STANAG 4233 Digital interoperability between EHF Tactical Satellite Communications Terminals
STANAG 4285 Characteristics of 1200/2400/3600 bit/s single tone MODEMs for HF radio links
STANAG 4355 (Edition 3, 17 April 2009): Modified Point Mass Trajectory Model
STANAG 4370 Environmental Testing
STANAG 4381 (Edition 1, 8 July 1994): Blackout Lighting Systems For Tactical Land Vehicles
STANAG 4383 12.7×99mm NATO adopted as standard small arms ammunition (12.7mm)
STANAG 4385 120 mm ammunition for smoothbore tank guns
STANAG 4395 (Edition 2, 10 May 2001): Connector For Tactical Land Wheeled Vehicles With Anti Lock Braking Systems
STANAG 4406 The adoption of a military message standard based around the civil X.400 standard
STANAG 4420 Display Symbology and Colors for NATO Maritime Units
STANAG 4425 A way to determine interchangeability of indirect fire ammunition; lists various artillery calibers, including 105 mm and 155 mm
STANAG 4458 105 mm ammunition for rifled tank guns
STANAG 4509 Technical performance specification providing for the interchangeability of 5.7×28mm ammunition
STANAG 4516 mentioned in conjunction with 35 mm x 228 KDG ammunition
STANAG 4525 Explosives, Physical/Mechanical Properties, Thermomechanical Analysis for Determining the Coefficient of Linear Thermal Expansion (TMA)
STANAG 4529 Characteristics of single tone MODEMs for HF radio links with 1240 Hz bandwidth
STANAG 4545 (Edition 2, 6 May 2013): NATO Secondary Imagery Format (NSIF)
STANAG 4559 (Edition 3, Amendment 2, 3 August 2016): NATO Standard Intelligence Surveillance Reconnaissance Library Interface (NSILI)
STANAG 4564 (Edition 1, 25 October 2007): Warship Electronic Chart Display and Information Systems (WECDIS)
STANAG 4565 (Edition 1, 26 September 2003): Airborne Multi-Mode Receiver for Precision Approach and Landing
STANAG 4569 Protection levels for Occupants of Logistic and Light Armoured Vehicles
STANAG 4575 (Edition 4, 2 December 2014): NATO Advanced Data Storage Interface (NADSI)
STANAG 4579 The adoption of standard Identification of Friend or Foe hardware that can be recognized and processed between all NATO nations
STANAG 4586 Standard Interface of the Unmanned Control System (UCS) for NATO UAV interoperability
STANAG 4603 Modelling and Simulation Architecture Standards for Technical Interoperability: High Level Architecture (HLA)
STANAG 4606 (Edition 4, 29 January 2021): Super High Frequency (SHF) MILitary SATellite COMmunications (MILSATCOM) EPM (Electronically Protected Measures) Waveform for Class B services
STANAG 4607 (Edition 3, 14 September 2010): NATO Ground Moving Target Indicator Format (GMTIF)
STANAG 4609 (Edition 4, 19 December 2016): NATO Digital Motion Imagery Standard
STANAG 4624 30x173mm autocannon ammunition
STANAG 4626: Modular and Open Avionics Architectures – Part I – Architecture
STANAG 4628 (Edition 1, 16 March 2011): Controller Area Network (Can) Protocols For Military Applications
STANAG 4676:(Edition 1, 20 May 2014): NATO Intelligence Surveillance Reconnaissance Tracking Standard (NITS)
STANAG 4694: NATO Accessory Rail
STANAG 4704: NATO requirements for calibration support of test & measurement equipment
STANAG 4748: JANUS, used for underwater acoustic communication
STANAG 4754: NATO Generic Vehicle Architecture (NGVA) for Land Systems
STANAG 4774: Confidentiality Label Syntax
STANAG 4778: Metadata Binding Mechanism
STANAG 5066: The adoption of a Profile for HF Data Communications, supporting Selective Repeat ARQ error control, HF E-Mail and IP-over-HF operation
STANAG 5516: Link 16 – ECM Resistant Tactical Data Exchange, a Tactical Data Link (TDL) protocol
STANAG 5518: Joint Range Extension Applications Protocol (JREAP), a Tactical Data Link (TDL) protocol
STANAG 5524: NATO Interoperability Standards and Profiles, a catalogue of relevant information and communication technology standards
STANAG 5602: Standard Interface for Military Platform Link Evaluation (SIMPLE), a Tactical Data Link (TDL) protocol
STANAG 6001 (Edition 4, 12 October 2010) Language Proficiency Levels
STANAG 6004 Meaconing, Intrusion, Jamming, and Interference Report
STANAG 6010 EW in the Land Battle (ATP-51)
STANAG 6022 (Edition 2, 22 March 2010): Adoption of a Standard Gridded Data Meteorological Message (METGM)
STANAG 7023 (Edition 4, Amendment 1, 16 June 2016): NATO Primary Image Format (NPIF)
STANAG 7024 (Edition 2, 2 August 2001): Imagery Air Reconnaissance Tape Recorder Standard
STANAG 7074 Digital Geographic Exchange Standard (DIGEST),
STANAG 7141 (Edition 4, 20 December 2006): Joint NATO Doctrine for environmental protection during NATO-led military activities
STANAG 7170 (Edition 2, 5 November 2010): Additional Military Layers (AML) – Digital geospatial data products

Draft STANAG 
STANAG 4179 A type of detachable firearm magazine proposed for standardization based on the USGI M16 rifle magazine.
STANAG 4181 A type of stripper clip and guide tool use to load magazines proposed for standardization based on the USGI M16 rifle stripper clips and guide tools.

References

External links
 U.S. Department of Defense quick search for military standards
 IEEE listing of NATO standards, of NPFC standards
 NATO STANAG Library (in English) (old website 1998)
 NATO STANAG search engine (old site 2006)
 NATO HQ STANAGs
 UK Defence Standardization